St. Nicholas Church is a 19th-century Russian Orthodox church in the town of Buzhaninovo in the Moscow region.

History 
According to historical records, the earliest (and the only) temple in Buzhaninovo was a St. Nicholas Church, first mentioned in 1543. In 1734, a new wooden construction replaced the time-worn church and was consecrated by the superior of the neighboring Holy Trinity Monastery, Archimandrite Varlaam.

A century later, a new stone church was built on the site in the Empire style. The central altar was dedicated to St. Nicholas, while the side-altar was dedicated to the Theophany.

In the 1940s, the church was closed and the services and masses were terminated, the bell tower was demolished and the church building was turned into a warehouse. In the early 1990s, with the change of the political climate in Russia, the church was returned to the local Christian community. The church building was restored, and was consecrated in 1998. On December 19, 2000, (St. Nicholas day, the church's patronal feast), a relic of St. Nicholas was granted to the church.

The church building and the bell tower have recently been restored. The new rectory building next to the church's West entrance accommodates a Sunday school and local parish assemblies.

Churches in Moscow Oblast
Russian Orthodox church buildings in Russia
1831 establishments in the Russian Empire
Churches completed in 1831
Cultural heritage monuments of regional significance in Moscow Oblast